Metatacha is a monotypic moth genus of the family Noctuidae erected by George Hampson in 1913. Its only species, Metatacha excavata, was first described by George Thomas Bethune-Baker in 1909. It is found in the Democratic Republic of the Congo and Uganda.

References

Catocalinae